Campiglossa albiceps is a species of fruit fly in the family Tephritidae.

References

Tephritinae
Diptera of North America
Insects described in 1873
Taxa named by Hermann Loew